6/4 may refer to:

 June 4, a day of the year in month-day date notation
 1989 Tiananmen Square protests and massacre, also referred to the June Fourth Incident
 6 April,  a day of the year in day-month date notation